Paradecolya inexspectata is a species of insect, belonging to the family of  Tettigonioidea.

This species is known from La Réunion. It has a body length of approximately 15mm.

References
Chopard. 1957. Mem. Inst. Sci. Madagascar (E) 8:39

Endemic flora of Réunion
Moths of Réunion
Tettigoniidae